JaMycal Hasty (born September 12, 1996) is an American football running back for the Jacksonville Jaguars of the National Football League (NFL). He played college football at Baylor.

College career
Hasty redshirted his true freshman season. As a redshirt freshman, he rushed for 623 yards and three touchdowns on 119 carries.

Professional career

San Francisco 49ers
Hasty signed with the San Francisco 49ers as an undrafted free agent on April 27, 2020. He was waived during final roster cuts on September 5, 2020, and signed to the team's practice squad the next day. He was elevated to the active roster on September 26 for the team's week 3 game against the New York Giants, and reverted to the practice squad after the game. He made his NFL debut in the game, catching one pass and rushing twice for nine yards. He was promoted to the active roster on October 3, 2020. In Week 8, against the Seattle Seahawks, he had his first professional rushing touchdown. On November 17, 2020, he was placed on injured reserve.

On September 25, 2021, Hasty was placed on injured reserve after suffering a high ankle sprain in Week 2. He was activated on October 23.

On March 10, 2022, Hasty re-signed with the 49ers. On August 30, Hasty was waived by the 49ers.

Jacksonville Jaguars
Hasty was claimed off waivers by the Jacksonville Jaguars on August 31, 2022. After playing minimal snaps the first seven weeks of the season, he was named the No. 2 running back behind Travis Etienne following the trade of James Robinson. He finished the season with 194 rushing yards and two touchdowns along with 20 catches for 126 yards and one touchdown.

References

External links
San Francisco 49ers bio
Baylor Bears bio

1996 births
Living people
American football running backs
Baylor Bears football players
People from Longview, Texas
Players of American football from Texas
San Francisco 49ers players
Jacksonville Jaguars players